Fashion Centre at Pentagon City, also known as Pentagon City Mall, is a shopping mall in the Pentagon City neighborhood of Arlington, Virginia, near Interstate 395 and Hayes Street. Its Metro level is directly connected to the Pentagon City station on the Blue and Yellow Lines of the Washington Metro.

Completed in October 1989, the Fashion Centre is the largest enclosed shopping mall in Arlington, housing 164 retailers and restaurants. It is anchored by department stores Macy's and Nordstrom, and is directly connected to the Ritz-Carlton Pentagon City hotel. The Washington Tower office building, formerly leased by MCI, is part of the mall property; its lower levels are part of the mall.

History
The mall was developed by Melvin Simon & Associates with real-estate investment firm Rose Associates as part of the 1976 Pentagon City Phased-Development Site Plan. It opened in fall 1989 with 860,000 sq. ft. of space on 25 acres, with Macy's and Nordstrom as anchor stores (original plans were for Bambergers) and approximately 150 other stores, and a 4,524-capacity parking garage; the office tower part of the complex opened a little later, and the 345-room hotel the following year. The interior featured a white color scheme and skylit atria extending in two wings from the central courtyard. The mall theater, Loews Pentagon City 6, closed on January 1, 2003, and was replaced by a clothing store.

Expansion of the mall, including outward-facing stores on Hayes Street, was approved by the county board in 2013, at which time it had more than 170 stores. It was completed in 2016. , the mall had  of space.

The 2020 COVID-19 pandemic led to the closure of a number of restaurants and stores in the mall.

Ownership
In late 1990, Melvin Simon & Associates sold 50% of its interest in the mall to Lehndorff Group, a real estate management firm; during 1991 it sold another 25% to other institutional investors, retaining a quarter interest and management of the center. The Ritz-Carlton hotel is separately owned, by Xenia Hotels & Resorts.

References

External links

 Official site

Buildings and structures in Arlington County, Virginia
Simon Property Group
Shopping malls in Virginia
Tourist attractions in Arlington County, Virginia
Shopping malls established in 1989
1989 establishments in Virginia
Shopping malls in the Washington metropolitan area